Raw Footage is the eighth studio album by American rapper Ice Cube. It was released on August 19, 2008, by his record label Lench Mob Records and EMI. The album features guest appearances from The Game, Butch Cassidy, Musiq Soulchild, Young Jeezy and WC. The album is his most political effort, since over a decade earlier with the release of his album The Predator (1992).

Preceding the release, supported by three singles; "Gangsta Rap Made Me Do It", "Do Ya Thang", and "Why Me?" featuring Musiq Soulchild.

Singles 
The lead single from the album, called "Gangsta Rap Made Me Do It" was released January 3, 2008. The song was produced by Maestro. In this single, Ice Cube addresses society's view of gangsta rap music, which has sometimes been blamed for criminality in America. On February 12, 2008, the single became available via iTunes. The music video features cameo appearances by WC and DJ Crazy Toones.

The album's second single, called "Do Ya Thang" was released through the iTunes on June 24, 2008. The song was produced by Palumbo Beats.

The music video for the third single, "Why Me?" featuring Musiq Soulchild, premiered on BET 106 & Park on September 24, 2008.

Other songs 
The song "It Takes a Nation" was released via iTunes Store on May 27, 2008. It was never officially released as a single.

Commercial performance 
Raw Footage debuted at number five on the US Billboard 200, selling 70,000 copies in its first week. This became Ice Cube's seventh US top-ten album.

Track listing 

Notes
 "What Is a Pyroclastic Flow?", "Hood Mentality", "Jack N the Box", "Get Used to It" and "Take Me Away" feature voice over by Keith David.
 "Cold Places" also featured on Ice Cube's greatest hits album The Essentials.

Sample credits
 "Hood Mentality" contains a sample of "Can I" performed by Eddie Kendricks.
 "Thank God" contains a samples of "If We Don't Make It, Nobody Can" performed by Tom Brocker (witten by Barry White, Bob Relf and Tom Brocker).
 "Stand Tall" contains a sample of "Be Thankful for What You Got", written and performed by William DeVaughn.

Charts

Weekly charts

Year-end charts

References

External links
 

2008 albums
Ice Cube albums
Albums produced by Emile Haynie
Albums produced by Scott Storch
Albums produced by Swizz Beatz
Albums produced by Tha Bizness
Albums produced by Warryn Campbell